was a Japanese samurai and businessman.

Career
In 1904, Kadono founded Chiyoda Mutual Life Insurance Company (Chiyoda Seimei Hoken).  It was the first in Japan with an American structure.  In 1906, he was a founder of Chiyoda Fire Insurance (Chiyoda Kasai Hoken).

References

External links
 National Diet Library,  Portraits of Modern Japanese Historical Figures, Kadono Ikunoshin
 Insurance Hall of Fame,  Ikunoshin Kadono

People from Mie Prefecture
1856 births
1938 deaths
Japanese chief executives